Tong Mei or Tong Mi was a village and an area at the border of Kowloon and New Kowloon in Hong Kong. The village was located approximately present-day Boundary Street, Wong Chuk Street and Tai Nan Street.

Tong Mi Road at its south is named after the area.

Sham Shui Po
Tai Kok Tsui
Former villages in Hong Kong